The toadstool groper (Trachypoma macracanthus), also known as the Pacific rockcod, Pacific perch, Strawberry cod and whitespotted sea bass is a sea bass of the subfamily Anthiinae of the family Serranidae, is found in the southern Pacific Ocean. Its length is between 20 and 40 cm.

Description
The toadstool groper is bright orange or red in colour with an irregular pattern of small white spots covering its body and the fins. It has large eyes which are set high on head. The lower border of the preopercular bone has three upward curving spines. The dorsal fin 12 spines while the anal fin contains 6 soft rays.

Distribution
The toadstool groper has been recorded from New Zealand and the Kermadec Islands, Easter Island, and the Desventuradas Islands of Chile. Around Australia it is found around southwestern and southeastern Australia, Lord Howe Island, Norfolk Island and the Elizabeth and Middleton Reefs.

Habitat and biology
It frequently hides in caves and underneath overhangs and it feeds on a variety of benthic invertebrates and smaller fishes. They are nocturnal hunters and one of their favourite prey items is "crayfish", leaving their shelters at night to hunt these crustaceans.

Species description
The toadstool groper was first formally described by the German born British ichthyologist Albert Günther in 1859 with the type locality given as Norfolk Island.

References

 Tony Ayling & Geoffrey Cox, Collins Guide to the Sea Fishes of New Zealand,  (William Collins Publishers Ltd, Auckland, New Zealand 1982) 

Anthiinae
Fish described in 1859
Taxa named by Albert Günther